Cathepsin T is an enzyme. This enzyme catalyses the following chemical reaction: Interconversion of the three forms of tyrosine aminotransferase, EC 2.6.1.5.

This enzyme degrades azocasein and denatured hemoglobin.

See also 
 Cathepsin

References

External links 
 

EC 3.4.22